Wikstroemia monticola, the montane false ohelo, is a small tree, of the family Thymelaeaceae.  It is endemic to Hawaii, specifically Maui.

Description
The shrub grows up to 3.0 m tall. Its branches are membranous. Its flowers are greenish yellow and its leaves are dark green and gray.

References

monticola